Tamal or tamale  may refer to:

Cuisine
 Tamale or tamal, a traditional Latin American dish made of masa steamed or boiled in a leaf wrapper
 Tamal de olla, Panamanian style of tamale
 Hot Tamales, a type of cinnamon flavored candy

Other uses
 Tamal, ruler of the Blemmyes 
 Tamale, Ghana, capital of the Northern region of Ghana
 Tamal, Iran (disambiguation), places in Iran
 Mount Tamalpais, coastal mountain in Marin County, California
 Tamal Dey (born 1964), Indian computer scientist and mathematician
 Tamal, common name for Garcinia hanburyi, the Indian gamboge tree
 Tamal, fictional orphan in the film Amphibious
"Tamale", a song by Tyler, the Creator from Wolf

See also
 Tomalley, lobster paste, a soft green substance found in the bellies of lobsters that is considered a delicacy
 Tamil (disambiguation)